FC Shana is a youth development association football academy in Haiti. It is one of the largest and most successful in the country.

History
FC Shana was originally started by the family of Haitian footballer Fabien Vorbe when he was five years old for him, his cousins and friends, but officially founded sometime around 1999. It was started to offer all levels of development and competition in football from ages 6 to 16 and also receives them from all social backgrounds and sometimes different nationalities.

Values
Shana teaches its students discipline, stressing fair play; to play with your heart out, and to combine skill with passionate football in order to be victorious.

International competition
Shana usually plays annually in Santo Domingo, the capital of neighboring Dominican Republic.

In 2009, the U17 team won the Cayman Classic youth football tournament that consisted U17 teams from Cayman Islands and Jamaica. The squad had just one seventeen year old.

In 2013, Shana participated in the Weston Cup & Showcase, an annual tournament in Florida, which had nearly 500 teams.

Shana participated in a competition at the West Orange Sports Complex from  22–25 January 2015. The U10 team won the tournament, while the U14 team finished third.

In 2016, Shana won the 2016 Weston Cup & Showcase in the Boys U17 Gold tournament during February 12–15.

Shana is one of the clubs to support the 2016 NYC Cup.

References

External links

Football academies in Haiti
1999 establishments in Haiti
Association football clubs established in 1999